Wariana is a village  west of Jalandhar in Punjab, India.

Climate 
Wariana has a humid subtropical climate with cold winters 0 degree and hot summers 48 degree. Summers last from April to June and winters from November to February. The climate is dry on the whole, except during the brief southwest monsoon season during July and August. The average annual rainfall is about 70 cm.

References 

Villages in Jalandhar district